Ruan Stefan Vermaak (born 1 May 1998) is a South African rugby union player for the  in Super Rugby and the  in the Rugby Challenge His regular position is lock, flank or number eight.

He represented South Africa at youth level, playing for the South Africa Schools 'A' team in the Under-19 International Series in 2015 and 2016 and for the South Africa Under-20 team at the 2018 World Rugby Under 20 Championship.

References

External links
   Ruan Vermaak Profile @ South Africa Springboks

Alumni of Monument High School
South African rugby union players
Living people
1998 births
People from Roodepoort
Rugby union locks
Lions (United Rugby Championship) players
South Africa Under-20 international rugby union players
Rugby union players from Gauteng
Golden Lions players
NTT DoCoMo Red Hurricanes Osaka players
Bulls (rugby union) players
Blue Bulls players